Tasty may refer to:

Taste, a sense

Music
 Tasty (band), a South Korean band
 Tasty (Good Rats album), 1974, or the title track
 Tasty (Kelis album), 2003
 Tasty (Patti LaBelle album), 1978
 Tasty (The Shadows album), 1977
 "Tasty", a song by NCT 127 from their 2022 album 2 Baddies

Other
 Tasty (web series), a video series created by BuzzFeed
 Tasty (nightclub), a nightclub in Melbourne, Australia, known for a police raid in 1994

See also
 Taste (disambiguation)